The Saab Car Museum is an automobile museum in Trollhättan, Sweden. It covers the history of the Saab brand of automobiles manufactured by Saab under various owners since 1947.

The museum's collection of about 120 vehicles was scheduled to be publicly auctioned off on January 20, 2012 by Swedish law firm, Delphi, in order to cover Saab's debts following the company's bankruptcy proceedings. However, the collection was preserved in its entirety by a bid of $4.15 million made by the city of Trollhättan, Saab AB and The Marcus and Amalia Wallenberg Memorial Fund.

The museum is curated by Peter Bäckström, remains open to the public, and hosts festivals regularly.

Cars on display 
The vehicles on display in the museum include:
 UrSaab, Saab's first vehicle, a prototype of the Saab 92.
 Saab 92, the first production vehicle produced by Saab.
 Saab 93, and variants based on this model.
 Saab GT750
 Saab Monster, an experimental variation of the Saab 93.
 Saab Sonett, also known as the Saab 94 or Super Sport
 Saab 95
 Saab 96
 Saab 98
 Saab Catherina
 Saab MFI 13
 Saab 97 Sonett II
 Saab 97 Sonett III
 Saab 99, and several variations of the vehicle.
 Saab 90
 Saab 900, both the original Saab 900 and the NG900.
 Saab 9000, including cars number one and two from "The Long Run" endurance test held in Talladega, Alabama, in October 1986.
 Saab 9-3, various years and body styles.
 Saab Aero-X
 Saab 9-1X Biohybrid
 Saab 9-1X Air
 Saab 9-X

Many newer models are also on display.

See also
List of automobile museums
National Electric Vehicle Sweden

References

Notes

Bibliography

External links

Saab Car Museum – official site 

Automobile museums in Sweden
Museums in Västra Götaland County
Saab
Trollhättan